Per Anders Andersson (born 15 March 1974) is a Swedish former professional footballer who played as a defensive midfielder. Starting off his career with Malmö FF in the early 1990s, Andersson went on to play professionally in England, Denmark, and Portugal before returning to Malmö in 2005 to finish up his career. A full international between 1994 and 2005, Andersson won 27 caps for the Sweden national team and represented them at UEFA Euro 2000 and 2004. He was also a squad player for the Sweden Olympic football team at the 1992 Summer Olympics.

Club career
Born in Tomelilla, Andersson played for Svenstorps IF as a child, but joined Malmö FF in 1990. He gradually became a star in the Allsvenskan, and was bought by English Premier League outfit Blackburn Rovers. There, he played four league matches, and scored once against Preston North End in the League Cup. He went on to play in Denmark and Portugal for Benfica, and returned to Malmö FF in July 2005. He remained in the club until the end of the 2008 season, when the team decided not to extend Anders contract. The news was received with dismay among Malmö supporters, and Anders himself has written about the situation at his blog at local newspaper Skånska Dagbladet. He later decided to retire from football, ending speculation that he might've been heading to local rivals Trelleborg.

International career

Youth 
After having represented the Sweden U17, U19, and U21 teams, Andersson was selected to represent the Sweden Olympic football team at the 1992 Summer Olympics in Barcelona.

Senior 
Andersson made his senior debut for the Sweden national team in a friendly game against Mexico on 24 February 1994. He scored his first international goal in a 1–0 King's Cup win against Japan on 13 February 1997. He was a squad player for Sweden at UEFA Euro 2000, and came in from the bench in a group stage 0–0 draw against Turkey before Sweden failed to advance to the second round. Four years later, he was a squad player for Sweden at UEFA Euro 2004 and started in the final group stage game against Denmark, before Sweden was eliminated in the quarter finals by the Netherlands.

Andersson made his last international appearance on 9 February 2005 in a 1–1 draw with France. He won a total of 27 caps, scoring 3 goals.

Career statistics

International 

Scores and results list Sweden's goal tally first, score column indicates score after each Andersson goal.

Honours 
AaB
Danish Superliga: 1998–99

Benfica
Taça de Portugal: 2003–04
Sweden

 King's Cup: 1997

References

External links
 Malmö FF profile 
 Aalborg BK profile 
 
 

1974 births
Living people
People from Tomelilla Municipality
Swedish footballers
Association football forwards
Sweden international footballers
Sweden youth international footballers
Olympic footballers of Sweden
UEFA Euro 2000 players
Footballers at the 1992 Summer Olympics
UEFA Euro 2004 players
Allsvenskan players
Premier League players
Danish Superliga players
Primeira Liga players
Malmö FF players
Blackburn Rovers F.C. players
AaB Fodbold players
S.L. Benfica footballers
C.F. Os Belenenses players
Swedish expatriate footballers
Swedish expatriate sportspeople in England
Expatriate footballers in England
Swedish expatriate sportspeople in Denmark
Expatriate men's footballers in Denmark
Swedish expatriate sportspeople in Portugal
Expatriate footballers in Portugal
Swedish association football commentators
Footballers from Skåne County